Ronald Allan Attwell (February 9, 1935 – December 4, 2017) was a Canadian professional ice hockey player who played 22 games in the National Hockey League.  He played with the St. Louis Blues and New York Rangers.

Family life
Ron was the father of Bob Attwell. His nephew is Bill McCreary Jr.

External links

1935 births
2017 deaths
Canadian ice hockey right wingers
New York Rangers players
St. Louis Blues players
Ice hockey people from Toronto